Manolo Jiménez Rodríguez (14 December 1941 – 5 December 2021) was a Spanish footballer who played as a forward.

Biography
Jiménez began his career with Triana Balompié. Before he could start for the Triana first team, he was recruited by CD Badajoz, and played two good seasons in the Segunda División. He was then recruited by FC Barcelona, where he remained for two and a half seasons without playing a single game. He was loaned to Celta de Vigo and subsequently transferred to the club, taking part in the inaugural UEFA Cup. He retired from playing in 1975.

He died in Vigo on 5 December 2021, at the age of 79.

References

1941 births
2021 deaths
Footballers from Seville
Spanish footballers
Association football forwards
La Liga players
Segunda División players
Real Betis players
CP Mérida footballers
CE Constància players
Xerez CD footballers
CD Badajoz players
FC Barcelona players
RC Celta de Vigo players
Girona FC players